This article presents lists of the literary events and publications in the 15th century.


Events

1403 – A guild of stationers is founded in the City of London. As the Worshipful Company of Stationers and Newspaper Makers (the "Stationers' Company"), it continues to be a Livery Company in the 21st century.
1403–08 – The Yongle Encyclopedia is written in China.
c. 1408–11 – An Leabhar Breac is probably compiled by Murchadh Ó Cuindlis at Duniry in Ireland.
c. 1410 – John, Duke of Berry, commissions the Très Riches Heures du Duc de Berry, illustrated by the Limbourg brothers between c. 1412 and 1416.
1424 – The first French royal library is transferred by the English regent of France, John of Lancaster, 1st Duke of Bedford, to England.
1425 – At about this date the first Guildhall Library (probably for theology) is established in the City of London under the will of Richard Whittington.
1434 – Japanese Noh actor and playwright Zeami Motokiyo is exiled to Sado Island by the Shōgun.
1438: 28 April – Completion of Margery Kempe's The Book of Margery Kempe, the first known English autobiography, begins (by dictation) at Bishop's Lynn in England; it will not be published in full until 1940.
1442 – Enea Piccolomini, the future Pope Pius II, arrives at the court of Frederick III, Holy Roman Emperor, in Vienna, who names him imperial poet.
1443 – King Sejong the Great establishes Hangul as the native alphabet of Korean. It is first described in the Hunminjeongeum published on 9 October 1446
1444: 15 June – Cosimo de' Medici founds a public library at San Marco, Florence, based on the collection of Niccolò de' Niccoli.
1448 – Pope Nicholas V founds the Vatican Library in Rome.
1450 – Johannes Gutenberg has set up his movable type printing press as a commercial operation in Mainz by this date and a German poem has been printed.
1451
1 August – A manuscript of Dante's Divine Comedy is sold in London.
Sir Thomas Malory of Newbold Revel in Warwickshire, England, presumed author of the chivalric tales of Le Morte d'Arthur, is imprisoned for most of the following decade on multiple charges including violent robbery and rape.
1452 – Completion of the Malatestiana Library (Biblioteca Malatestiana) in Cesena (in the Emilia-Romagna region of Italy, commissioned by the city's ruler Malatesta Novello), the first European public library, in the sense of belonging to the commune and open to all citizens.
1453 – Pageant of Coriolan staged in the piazza of Milan Cathedral.
1455
23 February – Johannes Gutenberg completes printing of the Gutenberg Bible in Mainz, the first major book printed with movable type in the West, using a textualis blackletter typeface.
5 June – French poet François Villon is implicated in a murder.
1457
14 August – The Mainz Psalter, the second major book printed with movable type in the West, the first to be wholly finished mechanically (including colour) and the first to carry a printed date, is printed by Johann Fust and Peter Schoeffer for the Elector of Mainz.
The Central Library of Astan Quds Razavi in Persia is known to be in existence.
1460 – From about this date, Matthias Corvinus, King of Hungary, begins to form the Bibliotheca Corviniana, Europe's largest secular library.
1461 – Albrecht Pfister is pioneering movable type book printing in German and the addition of woodcut illustrations in Bamberg, producing a collection of Ulrich Boner's fables, Der Edelstein, the first book printed with illustrations. Soon after this he prints the first known Biblia pauperum (picture Bible). 

1462: 10 September – Robert Henryson enrols as a teacher in the recently founded University of Glasgow in Scotland.
1462: 8 November – First known sentence written in Albanian, a Formula e pagëzimit (baptismal formula) by Archbishop Pal Engjëlli.
1463: 5 January – François Villon is reprieved from hanging in Paris but never heard of again.
1465 – Having established the Subiaco Press at Subiaco in the Papal States in 1464, German printers Arnold Pannartz and Konrad Sweynheim produce an edition of Donatus (lost), a Cicero, De Oratore (September 1465) and Lactantius' De divinis institutionibus (October 1465), followed by Augustine's De civitate Dei in 1467, the first books to be printed in Italy, using a form of Roman type.
1467 – German printers Arnold Pannartz and Konrad Sweynheim move from Subiaco to Rome where the Massimo family place a house at their disposal and they publish an edition of Cicero's letters that gives its name to the typographic unit of measurement the cicero.
1468
31 May – The Byzantine scholar Cardinal Basilios Bessarion donates his library to the Republic of Venice, the foundation of the Biblioteca Marciana.
The printers Johann and Wendelin of Speyer settle in Venice; their first book published here, Cicero's Epistolae ad familiares, appears in 1469.
1470
Johann Heynlin prints the first book in Paris, the Epistolae Gasparini of Gasparinus de Bergamo (d. c. 1431), a guide to writing Latin prose.
Nicolas Jenson's edition of Eusebius, published in Venice, is the first book to use a roman type based on the principles of typography rather than manuscript.
, a sermon printed in Cologne, is the first book to incorporate printed page numbers.
1473
First book printed in Hungary, Chronica Hungarorum, the "Buda Chronicle".
First known printing in Poland, Almanach cracoviense ad annum 1474, a wall calendar.
1474
First book printed in Spain, the anthology of a religious poetry contest held this year in Valencia.
Approximate date – Georgius Purbachius (Georg von Peuerbach)'s  Theoricae nouae planetarum is published in Nuremberg, an early example of the application of color printing to an academic text.
1475
February – Pope Sixtus IV appoints the humanist Bartolomeo Platina as Prefect of the newly-re-established Vatican Library (Biblioteca Apostolica Vaticana) in Rome after Platina has presented him with the manuscript of his Lives of the Popes.
Rashi's commentary on the Torah is the first dated book to be printed in Hebrew, in Reggio di Calabria.
(or 1473–74?) – Recuyell of the Historyes of Troye is the first book to be printed in English, by William Caxton in Bruges using his own translation made in 1471.
1476
30 January – Constantine Lascaris's Erotemata ("Questions", also known as Grammatica Graeca) is the first book to be printed entirely in Greek (in Milan).
William Caxton sets up the first printing press in England, at Westminster. This year he prints improving pamphlets: Stans Puer ad Mensam (John Lydgate's translation of Robert Grosseteste's treatise on table manners, printed together with Salve Regina); The Churl and the Bird and The Horse, the Goose and the Sheep (both by Lydgate); and a parallel text edition of Cato with translation by Benjamin Burgh.
First performance of one of Terence's plays since antiquity, Andria in Florence.
1477
The first printed edition of Ptolemy's Geography (in Latin translation as Cosmographia) with maps, published in Bologna, is the first printed book with engraved illustrations and also the first with maps by a known artist, the plates having been engraved by Taddeo Crivelli of Ferrara (book wrongly dated 1462).
18 November – Caxton prints Earl Rivers' translation of Dictes or Sayengis of the Philosophres, the first full-length book printed in England on a printing press.

1478 – In England
William Caxton publishes the first printed copy of the Canterbury Tales.
The Ranworth Antiphoner is presented to St Helen's Church, Ranworth.
17 December – First book printed in Oxford.
1479
The St Albans Press, the third printing press in England, is set up in the Abbey Gateway, St. Albans.
Robert Ricart begins writing The Maire of Bristowe is Kalendar in Bristol, England.
1480s (approximate date) – Scottish makar Robert Henryson writes The Morall Fabillis of Esope the Phrygian.
1482: 25 January – Probable first printing of the Torah (in Hebrew with vowels and marks of cantillation printed), with paraphrases in Aramaic and Rashi's commentary, printed in Bologna.
1483: 22 February – First known book printed in Croatian, the Missale Romanum Glagolitice (Misal po zakonu rimskoga dvora), a missal printed in Glagolitic script, edited in Istria and printed in either Venice or in Croatia at Kosinj.
1484: 22 June – First known book printed by a woman, Anna Rügerin, an edition of Eike of Repgow's compendium of customary law, the Sachsenspiegel, produced in Augsburg.
1485 – The play Elckerlijc wins first prize in the Rederijker contest in Antwerp.
1488 – Duke Humfrey's Library at the University of Oxford receives its first books.
1490
Chinese scholar Hua Sui invents bronze-metal movable type printing in China.
Publication in Valencia of the prose chivalric romance Tirant lo Blanch completed by Martí Joan de Galba from the work of the knight Joanot Martorell (d. c. 1468), written in Valencian and a pioneering example of the novel in modern Europe.
1492: 16 January – Antonio de Nebrija publishes Gramática de la lengua castellana, the first grammar text for Castilian Spanish, in Salamanca, which he introduces to the Catholic Monarchs, Isabella I of Castile and Ferdinand II of Aragon, newly restored to power in Andalusia, as "a tool of empire".
1494: 17 August – Blaž Baromić completes the first work of his printing press in Senj, Croatia, a glagolithic missal, the second edition of the Missale Romanum.
1495: February–March – An edition of Constantine Lascaris's Erotemata in Greek with a parallel Latin translation (Grammatica Graeca) by Johannes Crastonis is the first book to be published by Aldus Manutius, in Venice, using typefaces cut by Francesco Griffo.
1495–1498 – Aldus Manutius publishes the Aldine Press edition of Aristotle in Venice.
1496: February – Francesco Griffo cuts the first old-style serif (or humanist) typeface (known from the 20th century as Bembo) for the Aldine Press edition of Pietro Bembo's narrative Petri Bembi de Aetna Angelum Chabrielem liber ("De Aetna", a description of a journey to Mount Etna) published in Venice, Aldus Manutius' first printing in the Latin alphabet and a work which includes early adoption of the semicolon (dated 1495 according to the more veneto).
1497
7 February (Shrove Tuesday) – Followers of Girolamo Savonarola burn thousands of "immoral" objects, including books, at the Bonfire of the Vanities in Florence, an episode repeatedly revisited in literature.
Possible date – First performance of the earliest known full-length secular play wholly in English, Fulgens and Lucrece by Henry Medwall, the first English vernacular playwright known by name, perhaps at Lambeth Palace in London.
1499: Late – Contents of the library of the Madrasah of Granada are publicly burned.

New works and first printings of older works
1400
Alliterative Morte Arthure
Shivaganaprasadi Mahadevaiah – Shunyasampadane
c. 1400–1410
Nicholas Love – The Mirror of the Blessed Life of Jesus Christ (translation and adaptation into Middle English of the Meditations on the Life of Christ)
1402
Christine de Pizan – Dit de la Rose
1402–1403
Christine de Pizan – Le livre du chemin de long estude
1405
Christine de Pizan
L'Avision de Christine
The Book of the City of Ladies (Le livre de la Cité des dames)
The Treasure of the City of Ladies (Le trésor de la Cité des dames; also known as The Book of the Three Virtues)
c. 1410
Mahathera Bodhiramsi – Cāmadevivaṃsa
1411
Thomas Occleve – The Regement of Princes
1413
Edward of Norwich, 2nd Duke of York – The Master of Game
1418
Domenico Bandini of Arezzo – Fons memorabilium universi
1420s?
The Awntyrs off Arthure
1420
John Lydgate – Siege of Thebes (poem)
Approximate date: Andrew of Wyntoun – Orygynale Cronykil of Scotland
1423
Jordi de Sant Jordi – "Presoner"
1424
Bhaskara – Jivandhara Charite
1425
Sharafuddin Ali Yazdi – Zafar Nama (history of Timur)
1427
Thomas à Kempis – The Imitation of Christ (De Imitatione Christi) (approximate date of completion)
1429
Leone Battista Alberti – Amator
Radoslav Gospels
(?) Kashefi – Anvār-e Soheylī ("The Lights of Canopus"), a translation of the Panchatantra
1430
Kallumathada Prabhudeva – Ganabhasita Ratnamale
1434
Treatise on the Barbarian Kingdoms on the Western Oceans (China)
Approximate date: John Lydgate – The Life of St. Edmund, King and Martyr
1435
Leon Battista Alberti – Della Pittura
1436
The Marvels discovered by the boat bound for the Galaxy (China)
1438
The Buik of Alexander
Gilte Legende, a translation into Middle English
1439
Kalyanakirti – Jnanachandrabhyudaya
1440
Zhu Quan – Cha Pu (Tea Manual)
Santikirtimuni – Santinathacharite
Approximate date: Geoffrey the Grammarian (probable compiler) – Promptorium parvulorum
1444
Aeneas Sylvius Piccolomini – The Tale of Two Lovers
1447
Walter Bower – Scotichronicon (completed)
1448
Vijayanna – Dvadasanuprekshe
1450
Reginald Pecock – Represser of over-much weeting [blaming] of the Clergie
Approximate date: Ballads "A Gest of Robyn Hode" and "Robin Hood and the Monk"
1453
Antoine de la Sale – Petit Jehan de Saintre
1455
Padmanābha – Kanhadade Prabandha
Pre-1460
Ausiàs March – Poems
Turpines Story (Middle English translation of the Historia Caroli Magni)
1461
François Villon – Grand Testament
1464
The Deeds of Sir Gillion de Trazegnies in the Middle East
A Short English Chronicle (Cronycullys of Englonde)
1467
Cardinal Juan de Torquemada – Meditationes, seu Contemplationes devotissimae ("Meditations, or the Contemplations of the Most Devout"), the first book printed in Italy to include woodcut illustrations
1469/70
Giovanni Boccaccio – The Decameron (completed 1353)
c. 1470–85
Pietru Caxaro – Il Cantilena, oldest known Maltese text
1471
Marsilio Ficino (translator) – De potestate et sapientia Dei, a translation from the Hermetica
1472
Dante Alighieri – Divine Comedy (written c.1308–21), first printed 11 April in Foligno, Italy, by Johann Numeister and Evangelista Angelini da Trevi
Johannes de Sacrobosco – De sphaera mundi (written c.1230), the first printed astronomical book
Paul of Venice (died 1429) – Logica Parva
Roberto Valturio – De re militari, the first book with technical illustrations
Approximate date: Thomas à Kempis (died 1471) – The Imitation of Christ (De Imitatione Christi) (first printing)
1472 or 1473
Johannes Tinctoris – Proportionale musices (Proportions in Music)
Zainuddin – Rasul Bijay (Victory of the Messenger) in Bengali
1473
Avicenna – The Canon of Medicine
Richard de Bury – The Philobiblon (first printing; written 1345)
Sir John Fortescue – The Governaunce of England (first published 1714)
Approximate date: Missale Speciale (Constance Missal)
1474
Obres e trobes en lahors de la Verge María, first literary book printed in Spain (40 poems in Catalan/Valencian, 4 in Spanish, 1 in Italian)
1475
(or 1473–74?) – Recuyell of the Historyes of Troye, the first book printed in English, by William Caxton, in his own translation, in Bruges
c. 1475?
The Squire of Low Degree
1476
Caxton's first edition of Geoffrey Chaucer's Canterbury Tales
1477
Earl Rivers (translator) – Dictes or Sayengis of the Philosophres (printed by William Caxton in Westminster) 
William Caxton (translation from the French of Raoul Le Fèvre) – History of Jason (printed by Caxton)
Bible in duytsche (Delft Bible)
The Travels of Marco Polo (first printing; written c.1299)
Approximate date: Blind Harry – The Wallace (The Actes and Deidis of the Illustre and Vallyeant Campioun Schir William Wallace, Middle Scots poem) 
1478
Bíblia Valenciana (Valencian Bible), the first printed bible in Catalan/Valencian, translated by Bonifaci Ferrer
1479
Rodolphus Agricola – De inventione dialectica
1480
Pierre Le Baud –  (approximate date of completion)
John of Capua – Directorium Humanae Vitae, a translation of the Panchatantra
1481
The boke intituled Eracles, and also of Godefrey of Boloyne the whiche speketh of the conquest of the holy londe of Iherusalem, a translation by William Caxton from Estoire d'Eracles, the French version of William of Tyre's Historia
Mirrour of the Worlde, a translation of 1480 by William Caxton from Vincent of Beauvais's Speculum Maius, the first book printed in England to include woodcut illustrations
The Historie of Reynart the Foxe (first English translation)
Approximate date: 'Pseudo-Apuleius' – Herbarium Apuleii Platonici, the first printed illustrated herbal
1482
Mosen Diego de Valera – Crónica abreviada de España ("Crónica Valeriana")
Euclid – Elements (in Latin)
Hans Tucher der Ältere – Beschreibung der Reyß ins Heylig Land
1483
The Book of the Knight of the Tower, a translation by William Caxton
The Golden Legend, a translation by William Caxton; as the most printed incunable across Europe, this reaches its 9th edition in English by 1527
Giacomo Filippo Foresti – Supplementum chronicarum
Das Der Buch Beyspiele, a translation of the Panchatantra
Theophrastus – Historia Plantarum (first Latin version of Περὶ φυτῶν ἱστορία translated by Theodore Gaza)
1484
Aesop's Fables, a translation (from French) by William Caxton
Plato – Opera Platonis (complete works), a translation by Marsilio Ficino
1485
Leon Battista Alberti (died 1472) – De Re Aedificatoria (written 1443–52), the first printed work on architecture
Joseph Albo – Sefer ha-Ikkarim (written before 1444)
Bommarasa of Terakanambi – Sanatkumara Charite
Sir Thomas Malory – Le Morte d'Arthur
1486
Bernhard von Breydenbach – Peregrinatio in Terram Sanctam, with illustrations taken from life by the printer Erhard Reuwich
The Boke of Seynt Albans, with a contribution attributed to Juliana Berners
Giovanni Pico della Mirandola – De hominis dignitate
1487
Niccolò da Correggio – Fabula di Cefalo
Heinrich Kramer with James Sprenger – Malleus Maleficarum, a witch-hunting manual
1489
Marsilio Ficino – De vita libri tres (Three Books on Life)
1490
John Ireland – The Meroure of Wyssdome
Joanot Martorell and Martí Joan de Galba – Tirant lo Blanch
c. 1490s
Jacomijne Costers – Visioen en exempel
1491
Johannes de Ketham (ed.) – Fasciculus Medicinae (first printed book to contain anatomical illustrations)
1492
John of Gaddesden – Rosa Medicinæ (first printing; written 1307)
1493
Giuliano Dati – Lettera delle isole novamente trovata, a translation into verse of a letter from Christopher Columbus to Ferdinand of Spain, regarding Columbus' first exploratory voyage across the Atlantic in 1492
15 June: Hartmann Schedel – Nuremberg Chronicle
The Seven Sages of Rome, midland English version of the Seven Wise Masters story cycle (printed by Richard Pynson)
1494
Sebastian Brant – Ship of Fools (Daß Narrenschyff)
Fra Luca Pacioli – Summa de arithmetica
1496
Isaac Abrabanel – Ma'yene ha-Yeshu'ah
Juan del Encina – Cancionero
1497
Mīr-Khvānd – Rawżat aṣ-ṣafāʾ
1497–1504
Pietro Bembo – Gli Asolani (three volumes on courtly love, first printed 1505)
1498
Annio da Viterbo – Commentaria super opera diversorum auctorum de antiquitatibus loquentium ("Antiquities", forgeries)
Polydore Vergil – Adagia
1499
Francesco Colonna (attrib.) – Hypnerotomachia Poliphili
Pierre Desrey – Genealogie de Godefroi de Buillon
Thomas of Erfurt (mistakenly ascribed to Duns Scotus) – De Modis Significandi (first printing; written in early 14th century)
Niccolò Machiavelli – Discorso sopra le cose di Pisa
Fernando de Rojas – Comedia de Calisto y Melibea, better known as La Celestina
Polydore Vergil – De inventoribus rerum
Jehan Lagadec (ed.) – Catholicon, the first French dictionary (trilingual with Breton and Latin; compiled in 1464)
Undated
Krittibas Ojha (translator, died 1461) – Krittivasi Ramayan
Kim Si-seup (1435–93) – Geumo Sinhwa (金鰲新話, "Tales of Mount Geumo" or New stories of the Golden Turtle)
At least two of the Middle English versions of Ipomadon
Voynich manuscript (undeciphered, carbon dated to early 15th century)

Drama
c.1463–1475
Probable date of composition of the "N-Town Plays" in The Midlands of England
1470
Approximate date of composition of Elckerlijc, attributed to Peter van Diest (first printed 1495)
Probable date of composition of Mankind
1492
Juan del Encina – Triunfo de la fama
1493
Ludovico Ariosto – 
c.1497
Henry Medwall – Fulgens and Lucrece
Approximate date of composition
The Castle of Perseverance
The Somonyng of Everyman

Births

Early 15th c. – Henry Lovelich, English poet and translator from London
1405: 18 October – Aeneas Sylvius Piccolomini, Italian erotic poet and novelist, later Pope Pius II (died 1464)
1406 – Matteo Palmieri, Florentine humanist and historian (died 1475)
1413 – Giosafat Barbaro, Venetian travel writer (died 1494)
c. 1426 – Bhalan, Indian Gujarati-language poet (died c. 1500)
1432 – Ōta Dōkan (太田 道灌, Ōta Sukenaga), Japanese samurai warrior-poet and Buddhist monk (died 1486)
1434: 29 August – Janus Pannonius, Hungarian/Croatian poet and bishop writing in Latin (died 1472)
c. 1435 – Johannes Tinctoris (Jehan le Teinturier), Low Countries' writer on music and musician (died 1511)
1441: 9 February – Ali-Shir Nava'i, Chagatai Turkic-language Timurid poet and scholar (died 1501)
c. 1441 – Felix Fabri (Felix Faber), Swiss Dominican theologian and travel writer (died 1502)
1449 – Aldus Manutius, Italian publisher (died 1515)
c. 1451 – Richard Methley, English Dominican writer and translator (died 1527 or 1528)
1453 – Ermolao Barbaro, Italian scholar (died 1493)
c. 1460 – John Skelton, English poet (died 1529)
1462: 8 September – Henry Medwall, English playwright and ecclesiastical lawyer (died c. 1501/2?)
1465 – Yamazaki Sōkan (山崎宗鑑, Shina Norishige), Japanese poet (died 1553)
1470: 20 May – Pietro Bembo, Venetian-born scholar, poet and cardinal (died 1547)
c. 1473 – Jean Lemaire de Belges, Walloon French poet and historian (died c. 1525)
1475 – Ludovico Vicentino degli Arrighi, Italian calligrapher and type designer (died 1527)
1483: 6 March – Francesco Guicciardini, Italian historian and statesman
1483: 19 April – Paolo Giovio, Italian contemporary historian, bishop and scientist (died 1552)
1485 – Hanibal Lucić, Croatian poet and playwright (died 1553)
1486: 28 July – Pieter Gillis, Flemish humanist, printer and Antwerp city official (died 1533)
1488: c. 24 August – Ferdinand Columbus, Spanish bibliophile (died 1539)
1488: (estimated) – Otto Brunfels, German botanist and theologian (died 1534)
1490: Gáspár Heltai (Kaspar Helth), Transylvanian writer in German (died 1574)
1494: November (probable) – François Rabelais, French writer (died 1553)
1496: 23 November – Clément Marot, French poet (died 1544)
1497 – Edward Hall, English historian, politician and lawyer (died 1547)

Deaths
1400 – Jan of Jenštejn, archbishop of Prague, writer, composer and poet (born 1348)
1406: 19 March – Ibn Khaldun, North African historiographer and philosopher (born 1332)
c. 1416 – Julian of Norwich, English religious writer and mystic (born c. 1342)
1426 – Thomas Hoccleve, English poet and clerk (born c. 1368)
c. 1426 – John Audelay, English poet and priest (year of birth unknown)
c. 1430 – Christine de Pizan, French poet and author of conduct books (born 1364)
c. 1440 – Margery Kempe, English mystic and autobiographer (born c. 1373)
c. 1443 – Zeami Motokiyo (世阿弥 元清), Japanese Noh actor and playwright (born c. 1363)
1448 – Zhu Quan (朱|權), Prince of Ning, Chinese military commander, feudal lord, historian and playwright (born 1378)
c. 1451 – John Lydgate, English poet and monk (born c. 1370)
1454 – Francesco Barbaro, Italian humanist and politician (born 1390)
1458 – Íñigo López de Mendoza, 1st Marquis of Santillana, Castilian politician and poet (born 1398)
1459 - Ausiàs March, Valencian poet and knight (born 1400)
1464: 
14 August – Pope Pius II
John Capgrave, English historian and scholastic theologian (born 1393)
1468 – Joanot Martorell, Valencian novelist and knight (born 1413)
1471 – Sir Thomas Malory, presumed English writer (year of birth unknown)
1472: 27 March – Janus Pannonius, Hungarian/Croatian poet and bishop writing in Latin (born 1434)
1475 – Matteo Palmieri, Florentine historian and humanist (born 1406)
c. 1483 – Richard Holland, Scottish cleric and poet
1486 – Margareta Clausdotter, Swedish chronicler and nun
c. 1490 – Lewys Glyn Cothi, Welsh poet (born 1420)
1492 – Jami, Persian poet and scholar (born 1414)
1493 – Ermolao Barbaro, Italian scholar (born 1453)
1494 – Giosafat Barbaro, Italian travel writer, diplomat and explorer (born 1413)
1496: 28 August – Kanutus Johannis, Swedish Franciscan friar, writer and book collector

See also
15th century in poetry
 14th century in literature
 16th century in literature
 List of years in literature

References

 

 
 
Renaissance literature
History of literature